Kontaktor is a Norwegian production-team from Oslo and consists of Daniel Wold (born 1986) and Marius Njølstad (born 1989).

Career
Daniel Wold and Marius Njølstad has worked together in different settings over the last years, Wold as a sound engineer and Njølstad as a keyboardist. Kontaktor started out as listening-sessions during the winter of 2010. This inspired them to start a collaboration. Over the next few months they founded the label Tape Delay Records in order to release their first single "Bocce Ball", as well as remixes of this track.

In 2010 kontaktor released the single Bocce Ball. The song has been remixed by artists such as LehtMoJoe, PistolPuma, Yade and Fred Acler.

In 2010 kontaktor competed in the international John Lennon Songwriting Contest (session II) with the song Bocce Ball. Kontaktor won the Grand Prize in the category Electronic. In the next round, where they competed against the winner of session I in the category Electronic in 2010, they won the Lennon Award in the same category.

kontaktors first EP, "SoundCheck EP", was released 28 March 2011.

In January 2012 several artists contributed to the Back To School (EDITS). The following artists made their version of the track or contributed to the track: LehtMoJoe, LidoLido and Proviant Audio.

Discography

EP
2011 — SoundCheck EP

Singles
2010 — Bocce Ball
2012 — Back To School

Remixes/Edits
2011 Moddi — Ardennes (kontaktor remix)
2012 Kontaktor — Back To School (EDITS)

References

External links
Official Myspace
Official Facebook site
Official Soundcloud site

Electronica music groups
Norwegian electronic music groups